Mărgărit Blăgescu (26 August 1925 – March 2004) was a Romanian sportsman who competed as a bobsledder at the 1956 Winter Olympics. He played as a prop for the Romania national rugby union team during the 1950s.

References

1925 births
2004 deaths
Romanian male bobsledders
Olympic bobsledders of Romania
Bobsledders at the 1956 Winter Olympics
Romania international rugby union players
Rugby union props